Pongee is a type of slub-woven fabric, created by weaving with yarns that have been spun by varying the tightness of the yarn's twist at various intervals. Pongee is typically made from silk, and results in a textured, "slubbed" appearance; pongee silks range from appearing similar to satin to appearing matte and unreflective. Though pongee is typically made out of silk, it can be woven from a variety of fabrics, such as cotton, linen and wool.

In the early 20th century, pongee was an important export from China to the United States. Pongee is still woven in silk by many mills across China, especially along the banks of the Yangtze River at mills in Sichuan, Anhui, Zhejiang and Jiangsu provinces.

Pongee types 
Pongee is created through weaving yarns that have been twisted unevenly at various points; the resulting fabric typically has horizontal "slubs" running along the weft, where yarns increase and decrease in thickness.

See also

References

External links
 'Oshima Tsumugi' pongee, a traditional Japanese craft

Woven fabrics